West Falls Church is a census-designated place (CDP) in Fairfax County, Virginia, United States. The population was 29,207 at the 2010 census.
Before 2010, West Falls Church was officially named Jefferson. Outside of the Jefferson Village neighborhood, "Jefferson" generally is not used locally to refer to the area bounding Falls Church city to the south and southwest that comprises the CDP.  Likewise, "West Falls Church" is rarely used to describe the area but is usually applied to areas west of Falls Church city or near West Falls Church Metro station. The bulk of it is made of subdivisions built in the 1940s and early 1950s, including Jefferson Village, Westlawn, Hillwood, Sleepy Hollow, Woodley, Raymondale and Broyhill Park.

History
Following the American Civil War, local blacks established prosperous communities in an area then called South Falls Church, along Tinner's Hill and elsewhere.  In 1887, white Falls Church residents successfully gerrymandered heavily black South Falls Church out of the town limits and shrank the area of the town by one third.  It is speculated that the reason for the shrinking of the town limits was a fear of black power to swing local elections.  This was never reversed, and caused the boundary of the future City of Falls Church to follow South Washington Street.  The name South Falls Church subsequently fell out of use.

Before 2010, the West Falls Church CDP was officially named Jefferson but that name was rarely used for the area.  As the CDP does not lie to the immediate west of Falls Church city, "West Falls Church" is also an uncommon designation for the area and more often refers to the area around West Falls Church station several miles away in the Idylwood CDP.

Geography
West Falls Church is located at  (38.8655595, −77.1876993).

According to the United States Census Bureau, the CDP has a total area of 5.03 square miles (13.0 km), of which, 4.99 square miles (12.9 km) of it is land and 0.04 square miles (0.1 km) of it (0.77%) is water.

Demographics

At the 2000 census there were 27,422 people, 10,016 households, and 6,470 families in the CDP. The racial makeup of the CDP was 61.35% White, 4.54% African American, 0.34% Native American, 19.16% Asian, 0.03% Pacific Islander, 10.56% from other races, and 4.03% from two or more races. Hispanic or Latino of any race were 23.16%.

When compared to other states, Virginia has a relatively high number of residents that were born in Bolivia, and West Falls Church has a population of 3,226 Bolivian Americans, which means West Falls Church is the 5th largest community of Bolivians in the United States.
Of the 10,016 households 29.5% had children under the age of 18 living with them, 50.8% were married couples living together, 9.4% had a female householder with no husband present, and 35.4% were non-families. 25.8% of households were one person and 6.4% were one person aged 65 or older. The average household size was 2.74 and the average family size was 3.30.

The age distribution was 21.7% under the age of 18, 8.5% from 18 to 24, 38.2% from 25 to 44, 22.5% from 45 to 64, and 9.0% 65 or older. The median age was 35 years. For every 100 females, there were 100.9 males. For every 100 females age 18 and over, there were 99.6 males.

The median household income was $66,445 and the median family income  was $72,682 (these figures had risen to $100,471 and $103,932 respectively as of a 2017 estimate). Males had a median income of $42,776 versus $37,416 for females. The per capita income for the CDP was $28,705. About 3.5% of families and 4.8% of the population were below the poverty line, including 6.3% of those under age 18 and 3.1% of those age 65 or over.

Economy
General Dynamics, HITT Contracting, and Northrop Grumman have their corporate headquarters in West Falls Church.

The Defense Health Agency is headquartered in West Falls Church.

Education

Fairfax County Public Schools operates public schools.

Falls Church High School is located in West Falls Church CDP.

Fairfax County Public Library operates the Thomas Jefferson Library in the CDP.

References

Census-designated places in Fairfax County, Virginia
Census-designated places in Virginia
Washington metropolitan area